Eduvard "Eddie" Krncevic  (born 14 August 1960) is a retired Australian footballer who played as a striker, and a current manager.

Football career

Club career
After playing his first four years of professional football in Australia, Krncevic moved to the land of his parents in 1981, joining Croatian side NK Dinamo Zagreb, where he had relative individual success, besides helping the side win one league and one cup.

Krnčević then played four months in the German second division with MSV Duisburg, after which he embarked on his most successful spell, ten and a half years in Belgium – with one season in France with FC Mulhouse in between – where he represented Cercle Brugge KSV, Royal Charleroi, R.S.C. Anderlecht, R.F.C. de Liège and K.S.C. Eendracht Aalst; he became the first Australian-born player to be crowned top scorer in a European league.

Even though silverware was hard to come even at Anderlecht, in 1988–89 Krnčević was crowned the league's top scorer at 23 goals, and helped the capital side to the domestic cup – in that competition, he scored in all three finals he won, the first being with Cercle.

In 1996, already at 36, Krncevic returned to his country and played one final season with the Gippsland Falcons. In the late 1990s and early 2000s, he had a coaching career, with all the clubs hailing from his homeland, in the National Soccer League. Internationally, he opted to represent his birth country, scoring every other match in 35 caps, and helping the country to win the 1980 OFC Nations Cup.

International career
Krncevic was captain of the Australia team that won the 1980 Oceania Cup, of which only one match, an 11–2 defeat of Papua New Guinea, counted as a full international match.

Honours

Club
Essendon Croatia
Victorian Champions (1): 1978
Victorian State League Cup (1): 1978
Ampol Cup (2): 1977, 1978
Armstrong Cup (1): 1977
Marconi
National Soccer League (1): 1979
NSL Cup (1): 1980
Dinamo Zagreb
Yugoslav League (1): 1981–82
Yugoslav Cup (1): 1982–83
Cercle Brugge
Belgian Cup (1): 1984–85, Runner-up 1985–86
Anderlecht
Belgian League (1): 1986–87
Belgian Cup (2): 1987–88, 1988–89
Belgian Super Cup (1): 1987

Country
Australia
OFC Nations Cup (1): 1980

Individual
Medal of the Order of Australia (OAM) – 2021
FFA Hall of Champions Inductee – 2000
Belgian League: Top scorer 1988–89
NSL: Papasavas Medal (U-21) 1979

References

External links
FFA – Hall of Fame profile
Oz Football profile

1960 births
Living people
Sportspeople from Geelong
Soccer players from Victoria (Australia)
Australian people of Croatian descent
Association football forwards
Australian soccer players
National Soccer League (Australia) players
Marconi Stallions FC players
Sydney United 58 FC players
Melbourne Knights FC players
Yugoslav First League players
GNK Dinamo Zagreb players
2. Bundesliga players
MSV Duisburg players
Belgian Pro League players
Cercle Brugge K.S.V. players
R.S.C. Anderlecht players
RFC Liège players
R. Charleroi S.C. players
S.C. Eendracht Aalst players
Ligue 1 players
FC Mulhouse players
Australia international soccer players
Australian soccer coaches
South Melbourne FC managers
Gippsland Falcons players
Recipients of the Medal of the Order of Australia
1980 Oceania Cup players
Australian expatriate soccer players
Expatriate footballers in Germany
Expatriate footballers in Belgium
Expatriate footballers in Yugoslavia
Expatriate footballers in France
Australian expatriate sportspeople in Germany
Australian expatriate sportspeople in Belgium
Australian expatriate sportspeople in Yugoslavia
Australian expatriate sportspeople in France